Coosa High School is a public high school in unincorporated Floyd County, Georgia, United States, with a Rome postal address. A part of the Floyd County School District, it serves the areas of Garden Lakes, Cave Spring, Alto Park, and Coosa Valley. The school colors are black and white.

In 2021, four white students were filmed at the school carrying the Confederate flag and using racial slurs and the school took no action against these students. A group of racially mixed students planned a protest and the school suspended several of the planners.  All of the suspended students were black.

Reports of racism by teachers and some white students against African-American students at Coosa High School, and the refusal of the Floyd County School District to take disciplinary action against the racist behavior have resulted in the school district and board of education in Floyd County being sued by the students and mothers of the students. The lawsuit also cites the incident of students wearing Black Lives Matter T-shirts have been suspended, despite the fact the school has taken no action against racist students who used racial slurs against African-American or students who carried the Confederate flag on school grounds.

Notable alumni
 Mike Glenn - professional basketball player
 Bernard Holsey - professional football player
 Chris Jones - professional football player

References

External links 
 Coosa High School

Public high schools in Georgia (U.S. state)
Schools in Floyd County, Georgia